The 2017–18 South Dakota State Jackrabbits women's basketball represent South Dakota State University in the 2017–18 NCAA Division I women's basketball season. The Jackrabbits, led by eighteenth year head coach Aaron Johnston. The Jackrabbits compete in the Summit League. They play home games in Frost Arena, in Brookings, South Dakota. They finished the season 26–7, 12–2 in Summit League play to finish in second place. They were champions of The Summit League women's tournament and earn an automatic trip to the NCAA women's tournament where they lost to Villanova in an overtime thriller in the first round.

Previous season
The 2016–17 South Dakota State Jackrabbits women's basketball team went 23-9 overall and 12-4 in conference. The Jackrabbits lost in the 2017 Summit League women's basketball tournament to IUPUI not qualifying for the NCAA Tournament. As a result of not qualifying, the Jackrabbits made it to the 2017 WNIT.

Roster

Schedule

|-
!colspan=9 style="background:#003896; color:#F7D417;"| Exhibition

|-
!colspan=9 style="background:#003896; color:#F7D417;"| Regular season

|-
!colspan=9 style="background:#003896; color:#F7D417;"| The Summit League women's tournament

|-
!colspan=9 style="background:#003896; color:#F7D417;"| NCAA 
Women's tournament

Rankings
2017–18 NCAA Division I women's basketball rankings

References

South Dakota State Jackrabbits women's basketball seasons
South Dakota State
Jack
Jack
South Dakota State